Tony Valente (born 1981) is a Canadian politician, who serves as a Councillor on the City of North Vancouver, British Columbia council. Valente was elected in 2018.

Political career

In 2014, Valente ran for council in the City of North Vancouver, but was not successful. He ran again in 2018 and was elected. He received the third most votes for council.  During the campaign, Valente advocated for  transportation options including public transit, alternative transit modes, public space, and a variety of housing forms.

Valente has been an outspoken advocate for more cycling infrastructure, as well as cyclist safety. Valente served as Chair of the HUB North Shore committee from 2015 to 2018. HUB Cycling is a charitable non-profit organization, established in 1998 to improve cycling conditions in Metro Vancouver.

Valente's engagement in City of North Vancouver politics began with a petition regarding municipally-owned lands at the waterfront. He presented a petition pushing for public space.  As a result, he became a founding member of the North Van Urban Forum, a non-profit society "working to facilitate transparency and community participation in the development of the public realm in North Vancouver".http://nvuf.org/ The North Van Urban Forum organized events and discussions focused mainly on the Shipyards area of the City of North Vancouver including Project Waterfront: North Van Design Jam.

References

Living people
1982 births
Date of birth missing (living people)
Place of birth missing (living people)
People from North Vancouver
British Columbia municipal councillors